The 2009 Toppserien was the twenty-third season of top-tier women's football in Norway since its establishment in 1987. A total of twelve teams contested the league, consisting of ten who competed in the previous season and two promoted from the 1. divisjon. Running from 13 April to 31 October 2009, it was won by Røa for the third consecutive year.  As winners, Røa qualified for the Round of 32 of the 2010–11 UEFA Women's Champions League as the sole representative from Norway. Because Norway had dropped to ninth place in the UEFA coefficient rankings for 2010–11, the runners-up in the Toppserien could no longer enter the Qualifying Round of the Champions League, as had been the case in the previous season.

Røa were confirmed as league champions on the last day of the season after drawing 0–0 with runners-up Stabæk, thus becoming the second team in the league's history to secure three consecutive titles (Trondheims-Ørn managed four in a row in 1994–1997). With their fourth league title overall, Røa also drew level with Sprint/Jeløy in terms of number of titles won, behind Trondheims-Ørn and Asker. Stabæk finished three points behind Røa in what was their first season after relocating to Bærum and becoming an affiliate of Stabæk Fotball. They had previously competed as Asker. Kolbotn finished third, six points behind Røa and three behind Stabæk.  

Neither of the two promoted teams were able to maintain their spot in the top flight. Fortuna Ålesund were the first team to be relegated to the 1. divisjon after losing 1–2 at home to Arna-Bjørnar on 26 September. They were joined by Sandviken on 10 October when they lost 0–4 at home, also to Arna-Bjørnar.

On 27 October, the Football Association of Norway penalized Fløya for their use of two ineligible players in the league and Norwegian Cup. The players, both acquired before the start of the season, were fielded in thirteen and nine matches respectively before it was discovered that the club had not registered the transfers properly. Fløya were fined 10,000 kroner and deducted four points. Consequently, they dropped from eighth to tenth place in the standings.

League table

Results

Top goalscorers

References

Toppserien seasons
Top level Norwegian women's football league seasons
1
Norway
Norway